Salzburg Festival: history and repertoire, 1922-26 lists all opera productions of the Salzburg Festival in its founding years.

Concept 
The first Salzburg Festival took place in 1920 — without operas although all concepts for the festival included operas as a main part of the endeavor. The first festival consisted of open air performances of the drama Jedermann [Everyman] by Austrian poet Hugo von Hofmannsthal who wrote several librettos for operas by Richard Strauss. The play was performed at the grand square in front of the Salzburg Cathedral. The play describes the life and death of a rich man and is based on several medieval mystery plays. Jedermann was directed by world-famous Max Reinhardt and was a stunning success. The play is still today performed every year at the same place.

In 1921, concerts were added to the festival program. Concerts of the world's best orchestras, singers and soloists still today represent an important pillar of Salzburg Festival. In 1922, Richard Strauss and Franz Schalk brought opera to the festival. Both were famous conductors and since 1919 functioned also as general managers of Vienna State Opera. They chose four works of Salzburg born genius Wolfgang Amadeus Mozart for the first season — the three Da Ponte operas and Die Entführung aus dem Serail [The Abduction from the Seraglio]. In the founding years the festival did not have the means to produce entire opera productions. So Strauss and Schalk brought the settings, the singers, the orchestra and the chorus from Vienna State Opera to Salzburg. The press critically noted that the opera program of the festival constituted ″the summer residence of Vienna State Opera″. Nevertheless, the performances were superb due to the orchestra, the chorus and the great singers.  They came from all over Europa and created excellent ensembles for the Mozart operas, later on also for works by  Donizetti, Johann Strauß and Richard Strauss. An important role was also given to set designer Alfred Roller who dominated the visual aspect of the first Salzburg Festival opera performances.

All performances listed took place at the Salzburger Stadttheater.

1922 

Cast changes in repeat performances:
 Don Giovanni. Conductor: Karl Alwin; Don Giovanni: Hans Duhan, Donna Elvira: Felicie Hüni-Mihacsek, Donna Anna: Rose Pauly, Don Ottavio: Georg Maikl, Leporello: Karl Norbert, Zerline: Editha Fleischer, Masetto: Julius Betetto.
 Così fan tutte. Conductor: Karl Alwin; Dorabella: Claire Born, Despina: Charlotte Brunner, Don Alfonso: : Karl Norbert.
 Le nozze di Figaro. Gräfin: Claire Born, Felicie Hüni-Mihacsek, Susanne: Editha Fleischer, Figaro: Richard Mayr, Basilio: Paul Kuhn, Bartolo: Karl Norbert, Cherubino: Rosette Anday, Barbarina: Karola Jovanović.
 Die Entführung aus dem Serail. Konstanze: Elisabeth Rethberg, Blondchen: Karola Jovanović, Belmonte: Georg Maikl.

In 1923 there were no operatic performances at the Salzburg Festival. In 1924, the Festival had to be suspended due to an economic crisis in Austria.

1925 

Cast change in repeat performances:
 Don Giovanni. Zerline: Maria Ivogün.

1926 

Cast changes in repeat performances:
 Die Entführung aus dem Serail. Blondchen: Stella Eisner, Osmin: Karl Norbert.
 Die Fledermaus. Eisenstein: Richard Tauber, Adele: Paula Beck.
 Ariadne auf Naxos. Conductor: Richard Strauss (on August 21); Musiklehrer/Harlekin: Karl Renner, Ariadne: Claire Born.

See also 
Salzburg Festival: history and repertoire, 1935-37

Sources 
, 
, 
, .

References

History and repertoire, 1922-26, Salzburg Festival
Opera-related lists
1922 music festivals
1925 music festivals
1926 music festivals